Alfred Buxton may refer to:

 Alfred Fowell Buxton (1854–1952), British banker and local politician
 Alfred William Buxton (1872–1950), New Zealand landscape gardener and nurseryman